Rothmannia annae is a species of plant in the family Rubiaceae. It is endemic to the Seychelles.  It is found in its natural state only on Aride Island, where its habitat is protected by Island Conservation Society.

References

External links
 Aride Island
 Island Conservation Society

annae
Vulnerable plants
Endemic flora of Seychelles
Taxonomy articles created by Polbot
Taxa named by Ronald William John Keay